Stitt Plays Bird is an album by American jazz saxophonist Sonny Stitt, recorded in 1963 and issued on Atlantic Records in 1964. As the title suggests, it was recorded as a homage to the legendary saxophonist Charlie Parker, who was nicknamed "Bird."

Track listing
All pieces by Charlie Parker, unless otherwise noted.

"Ornithology" (Harris, Parker) – 3:41
"Scrapple from the Apple" – 3:49
"My Little Suede Shoes" – 3:06
"Parker's Mood" – 4:21
"Au Privave" – 2:40
"Ko-Ko" – 4:54
"Confirmation" – 4:36
"Hootie Blues"	(McShann) – 6:24
"Constellation" – 3:19

Bonus tracks on CD reissue:
"Now's the Time" – 3:18
"Yardbird Suite" – 4:49

Personnel
Sonny Stitt – alto saxophone
John Lewis – piano
Jim Hall – guitar
Richard Davis – bass
Connie Kay – drums

References

Atlantic Records albums
Albums produced by Nesuhi Ertegun
Sonny Stitt albums
1964 albums